Deltadromeus (meaning "delta runner") is a genus of theropod dinosaur from Northern Africa. It had long, unusually slender hind limbs for its size, suggesting that it was a swift runner. The skull is not known. One fossil specimen of a single species (D. agilis, or "agile delta runner") has been described, found in the Kem Kem Beds, which date to the mid-Cretaceous Period (mid-Cenomanian age), about 95 million years ago. It may be a junior synonym of the contemporary Bahariasaurus. The classification of Deltadromeus has been in flux since its original description. In 2016, a South American theropod known as Gualicho shinyae was found to possess many similarities with Deltadromeus. Depending on the phylogenetic position of Gualicho, Deltadromeus may have been a neovenatorid carnosaur, a tyrannosauroid, or a basal coelurosaur if its close relation to Gualicho is legitimate. Other studies have considered it a ceratosaurian, more specifically a member of the family Noasauridae.

Description
 
The weight of the living animal was estimated to have been around 1,050 kilograms, slightly more than an imperial ton.

A number of specimens (catalogued under IPHG 1912 VIII) were originally considered by Ernst Stromer to be conspecific with Bahariasaurus, but were referred to Deltadromeus by Paul Sereno in 1996. However, the referral of the coracoid, pubes and hindlimb material catalogued under IPHG 1912 VIII to Deltadromeus has been questioned because the remains came from different horizons and localities in the Bahariya Formation, and actually exhibit notable differences from the holotype of Deltadromeus.

The Deltadromeus skeleton has been found in the same formation as those of the giant theropods Carcharodontosaurus, Spinosaurus and Bahariasaurus, which may be synonymous with Deltadromeus. No skull material has been found for either Deltadromeus or Bahariasaurus, and though carnivore teeth labelled as "Deltadromeus" are sold in rock shops, there is no way of knowing if they actually come from this animal.

Classification

As a ceratosaur 
Many studies published since the original description of Deltadromeus have considered it to be a ceratosaur, although different studies disagree on what kind of ceratosaur. One 2003 study suggested it was a member of the Noasauridae, though others have found it to be more primitive, possibly related to the primitive ceratosaurs Elaphrosaurus and Limusaurus. A more comprehensive study of noasaurid relationships published in 2016 found that both of these interpretations were essentially correct, with Deltadromeus, Limusaurus and Elaphrosaurus all found to be within the Noasauridae. A 2017 paper describing ontogenetic changes in Limusaurus and the effect of juvenile taxa on phylogenetic analyses placed Deltadromeus as a noasaurid in every analysis regardless of which Limusaurus specimen was used, although the analyses did not include Gualicho or Aoniraptor. According to the writers of the paper, resolving the phylogenetic positions of Gualicho, Aoniraptor, Deltadromeus and megaraptorans is one of the most critical issues presently facing theropod systematics. Deltadromeus was also considered a noasaurid in a 2020 review of the Kem Kem Group geology and fauna.

The cladogram below follows a 2016 analysis by Oliver Rauhut and Matthew Carrano.

As an avetheropod 
The original description of Deltadromeus in 1996 found that it was a fairly basal coelurosaur, only slightly more advanced than the Late Jurassic genus Ornitholestes.
In 2016, an analysis of Gualicho, a South American theropod considered to belong to the allosauroid family Neovenatoridae, found Deltadromeus to be Gualichos probable sister taxon. However, the analysis also noted that Deltadromeus shared many features with ceratosaurs and that if Gualicho was removed from the analysis, Deltadromeus would resolve to a member of Ceratosauria. In an analysis of Aoniraptor, which may be the same animal as Gualicho, Deltadromeus was found along with Aoniraptor and Bahariasaurus to probably form a still poorly known clade of megaraptoran tyrannosauroids different from the Megaraptoridae. A 2018 study by Porfiri et al. has supported the idea that Gualicho and megaraptorans were basal coelurosaurs, outside of both Neovenatoridae and Tyrannosauroidea. However, this study did not include Deltadromeus.

The cladogram below follows the 2016 Gualicho analysis by Sebastián Apesteguía, Nathan D. Smith, Rubén Juarez Valieri and Peter J. Makovicky.

References

Prehistoric neotheropods
Late Cretaceous dinosaurs of Africa
Fossils of Egypt
Fossils of Morocco
Cretaceous Morocco
Cenomanian life
Fossil taxa described in 1996
Taxa named by Paul Sereno